The Chesapeake and Potomac Telephone Company Building is a historic structure located in Downtown Washington, D.C.  It was listed on the National Register of Historic Places in 1988.

History
This was the third building C&P Telephone built in downtown Washington and the second in a two-year period of time. This seven-story structure housed the company's new dial switching equipment that could not be accommodated in its existing facilities.  It was designed with Art Deco detailing and ornamentation by the New York architectural firm of Voorhees, Gmelin and Walker. The company began its first conversion to dial telephone service on May 3, 1930, when 60,000 telephones in downtown Washington were switched over from the old manual system.

See also
Chesapeake and Potomac Telephone Company, Old Main Building
Chesapeake and Potomac Telephone Company Warehouse and Repair Facility

References

Commercial buildings completed in 1928
Art Deco architecture in Washington, D.C.
Telecommunications buildings on the National Register of Historic Places
Commercial buildings on the National Register of Historic Places in Washington, D.C.
1928 establishments in Washington, D.C.